Judaism regards the violation of any of the 613 commandments as a sin. Judaism teaches that to sin is a part of life, since there is no perfect human and everyone has an inclination to do evil "from youth", though people are born sinless. Sin has many classifications and degrees. During the time of the Temple, Jewish courts punished certain sins with varying forms of punishment depending on the exact sin, as depicted in the Torah. These punishments vary from one of four forms of execution, to lashes, to fines, and everything in between. After the destruction of the second Temple and the Sanhedrin, physical punishments were no longer given due to the necessity of the Sanhedrin for their execution.

Unintentional sins are considered less severe sins. Sins committed out of lack of knowledge are not considered sins. 

Sins between people are considered much more severe in Judaism than sins between man and God. Yom Kippur, the holiest day of repentance in Judaism, can atone for sins between man and God, but not for sins between man and his fellow; that is, until he has received forgiveness from his friend.  Eleazar ben Azariah derived [this from the verse]: "From all your sins before God you shall be cleansed" (Book of Leviticus, 16:30) – for sins between man and God Yom Kippur atones, but for sins between man and his fellow Yom Kippur does not atone until he appeases his fellow.

When the Temple yet stood in Jerusalem, people would offer korbanot (sacrifices) for their misdeeds. The atoning aspect of korbanot is carefully circumscribed. For the most part, korbanot only expiate unintentional sins committed as a result of human forgetfulness or error. No atonement is needed for violations committed under duress or through lack of knowledge, and for the most part, korbanot cannot atone for malicious, deliberate sin. In addition, korbanot have no expiating effect unless the person making the offering sincerely repents of his or her actions before making the offering, and makes restitution to any person(s) harmed by the violation.

The completely righteous, meaning those who are clear from sin, enjoy this life and the life after. The average person suffers in this world in order to atone for their sins, leaving his complete heavenly reward to be enjoyed; if one's repentance and atonement are not complete in this world, their suffering will continue in the one of the lower gehinnom, and once their sins are completely atoned for, they join the righteous in heaven. The completely wicked, who have transformed into pure evil without a chance at repenting, are considered dead wild beasts; when they die, they go to the lowest level of the next world, where they are made nonexistent. They cannot correct their sins in this world or the next, and do not repent, even at the 'gates of hell', as it were. This world can therefore seem unjust where the righteous suffer, while the wicked prosper. Many great thinkers have contemplated this, but God's justice is long, precise and just.

Tanakh
The first mention of sin as a noun is a zoomorphism, with sin (hattath) crouching at Cain's door. The first mention as a verb is Abimelech being prevented from sinning (khata) against God in a dream. In fact, the whole Tanakh is full of references to sins committed by leading people, which teaches that no one is perfect, everyone stands in trials/tests, and people should try their best to learn from their own mistakes.

People have the ability to master this inclination and choose good over evil (conscience). Judaism uses the term "sin" to include violations of Jewish law that are not necessarily a lapse in morality. According to the Jewish Encyclopedia: "Man is responsible for sin because he is endowed with free will ("behirah"); yet he is by nature frail, and the tendency of the mind is to evil: "For the imagination of man's heart is evil from his youth" (Gen. viii. 21; Yoma 20a; Sanh. 105a). Therefore God in His mercy allowed people to repent and be forgiven." Judaism holds that all people sin at various points in their lives and that God tempers justice with mercy.

Terminology

Hebrew has several other words for sin beyond hata, each with its own specific meaning.  The word pesha, or "trespass", means a sin done out of rebelliousness. The word aveira means "transgression".  And the word avone, or "iniquity", means a sin done out of moral failing.  The word most commonly translated simply as "sin", hata, literally means "to go astray." Just as Jewish law, halakha, provides the proper "way" (or path) to live, sin involves straying from that path.

Judaism teaches that humans are born with free will, and morally neutral, with both a yetzer hatov, (literally, "the good inclination", in some views, a tendency towards goodness, in others, a tendency towards having a productive life and a tendency to be concerned with others) and a yetzer hara, (literally "the evil inclination", in some views, a tendency towards evil, and in others, a tendency towards base or animal behavior and a tendency to be selfish). The yetzer hara in some forms of Judaism means that Satan is merely an idiom or parable, rather than the fallen angel of traditional Christianity.

In Rabbinical literature
Obadiah ben Ya'aqob Siforno suggests that the verse about a leader begins with the term "when," which implies that committing a sin is inevitable because powerful and wealthy people—the leaders—are likely to sin. This Torah verse concludes with the words "realizes his guilt" (Leviticus 4:22) because it is essential that powerful people acknowledge and feel remorse for their sin, lest they sin again.

Transgression
The generic Hebrew word for any kind of sin is avera (literally: transgression). Based on verses in the Hebrew Bible, Judaism describes three levels of sin. There are three categories of a person who commits an avera. The first one is someone who does an avera intentionally, or "B'mezid." This is the most serious category. The second is one who did an avera by accident. This is called "B'shogeg," and while the person is still responsible for their action it is considered less serious. The third category is someone who is a "tinok shenishba", a person who was raised in an environment that was assimilated or non-Jewish, and is not aware of the proper Jewish laws, or halacha. This person is not held accountable for their actions.
Pesha (deliberate sin; in modern Hebrew: crime) or Mered (lit.: rebellion) - An intentional sin; an action committed in deliberate defiance of God; (Strong's Concordance :H6588 (פשע pesha', peh'shah).  According to Strong it comes from the root (:H6586); rebellion, transgression, trespass.
Avon (lit.: iniquity) - This is a sin of lust or uncontrollable emotion. It is a sin done knowingly, but not done to defy God; (Strong's Concordance :H5771 (avon, aw-vone).  According to Strong it comes from the root (:H5753); meaning perversity, moral evil:--fault, iniquity, mischief.
Cheit - This is an unintentional sin, crime or fault. (Strong's Concordance :H2399 (חַטָּא chate). According to Strong it comes from the root khaw-taw (:H2398, H2403) meaning "to miss, to err from the mark (speaking of an archer), to sin, to stumble."

States
Judaism holds that no human being is perfect, and all people have sinned many times. The Talmud says: "Everyone is responsible to be as great as Moses", But then the Torah tells us in Deuteronomy 34:10 that "No one will ever be as great as Moses". This is to clarify that Moses fulfilled his own personal potential, so too we are expected to fulfill ours. Each person is born with a unique set of talents and tools. Some are rich, others are poor. Some are tall and some are short. One person can sing, another can write, etc. But these qualities are not what determine your greatness. Rather, it's how you deal with your particular circumstances. That's why Judaism says: It's not important where you are on the ladder, but how many rungs you've climbed. The crucial concept is the effort.

Joseph Hertz said that sin is not an evil power whose chains the children of flesh must helplessly drag towards a weary tomb. We can always shake off its yoke; and what is more, we need never assume its yoke. An ancient fable tells us of distant oceans with mountainous magnetic rocks of such terrific power that wreck and ruin would befall any ship venturing near them. Instantly the iron nails would fly out of the ship, bolts and fastenings would be torn away by that magnetic force, the vessel would become nothing more than so many planks of wood, and all on board fall a prey to the hungry waters. Sins there are that, likewise, unhinge all our stays of character, rob us of the restraints of past habits and education, and leave us helpless playthings on the billows of temptation and passion. Yet a man is the pilot of his life's barque, and can at all times steer it so as never to come near those mountains of destruction, darkness, and death.

Based on the views of Rabbeinu Tam in the Babylonian Talmud (tractate Rosh HaShanah 17b), God is said to have Thirteen Attributes of Mercy:

 God is merciful before someone sins, even though God knows that a person is capable of sin. 
 God is merciful to a sinner even after the person has sinned. 
 God represents the power to be merciful even in areas that a human would not expect or deserve. 
 God is compassionate, and eases the punishment of the guilty. 
 God is gracious even to those who are not deserving. 
 God is slow to anger. 
 God is abundant in kindness. 
 God is the God of truth, thus we can count on God's promises to forgive repentant sinners. 
 God guarantees kindness to future generations, as the deeds of the righteous patriarchs (Abraham, Isaac and Jacob) have benefits to all their descendants. 
 God forgives intentional sins if the sinner repents. 
 God forgives a deliberate angering of Him if the sinner repents. 
 God forgives sins that are committed in error. 
 God wipes away the sins from those who repent.

As Jews are commanded in imitatio Dei, emulating God, rabbis take these attributes into account in deciding Jewish law and its contemporary application.

Role of orthopraxy

Jews recognize two kinds of sin, offenses against other people, and offenses against God.

Offenses against God may be understood as violation of a contract (the covenant between God and the Children of Israel). Ezra, a priest and scribe, headed a large body of exiles. On his return to Jerusalem to teach the laws of God he discovered that Jews have been marrying non-Jews. He tore his garments in despair and confessed the sins of Israel before God, before going on to purify the community. The Book of Jeremiah (Yirmiyahu [ירמיהו]) can be organized into five sub-sections. One part, Jeremiah 2-24, displays scorn for the sins of Israel. The poem in 2:1–3:5 shows the evidence of a broken covenant against Israel.

Since the destruction of the Temple in Jerusalem, Jews have believed that good actions (as opposed to only good belief) is how for one's sins. Midrash Avot de Rabbi Natan states the following:

One time, when Rabban Yochanan ben Zakkai was walking in Jerusalem with Rabbi Yehoshua, they arrived at where the Temple now stood in ruins. "Woe to us" cried Rabbi Yehoshua, "for this house where atonement was made for Israel's sins now lies in ruins!" Answered Rabban Yochanan, "We have another, equally important source of atonement, the practice of gemilut hasadim ("the action of kindnesses"), as it is stated "I desire loving kindness and not sacrifice" (Hosea 6:6).

In Judaism, all human beings are believed to have free will, with the ability to choose the path of life that they want to take. It does not teach that goodness is impossible, only difficult at times. If a person strays from the path of goodness in some aspect, there is always a "way back" if a person wills to try taking it. (Although texts mention some specific categories for whom the way back will be exceedingly hard, such as the slanderer, the habitual gossiper, and the malicious person.)

Sins between man and his fellow
Sins between people are considered much more severe in Judaism than sins between man and God. Yom Kippur, the main day of repent in Judaism can atones for sins between man and God, but not for sins between man and his fellow, that is until he has appeased his friend.(Mishnah, Yoma,8:9). Eleazar ben Azariah derived [this from the verse]: "From all your sins before God you shall be cleansed" (Book of Leviticus,16:30) – for sins between man and God Yom Kippur atones, but for sins between man and his fellow Yom Kippur does not atone until he appeases his fellow.

The Gemara (87a) continues: "R. Yitzchak said: Whoever aggravates his fellow even through words is required to placate him… R. Yosi bar Chanina said: Whoever beseeches forgiveness from his friend should not beseech him more than three times.  And if he died, [the offender] brings ten people and must stand them by his grave and he says, "I have sinned against the Lord, the God of Israel, and so-and-so whom I wounded.""

Many small sins vs. One big sin
Two Jews came to a Chassidic Rabbi to ask advice about sins they had committed. One had committed a great sin for which he was sure God would never forgive him; the other was less worried, because he had never been guilty of anything so grave, but only of the normal collection of lesser sins. The Rabbi told them to go out to a field and select stones corresponding to the size and number of their sins, and later to return to the field and scatter the stones. This done, they came back to the Rabbi. "Now go to the field once more," he told them both, "pick up the stones you scattered, and bring them to me."

He who had committed the one big sin knew at once which was his stone, and brought it to the Rabbi. The other, however, had scattered so many little stones that he could not be certain of identifying them again. He had a most difficult time in finding his stones and bringing them to the Rabbi. The Rabbi then told them: "Your deeds are like your stones. You who brought one large stone, committed a grave sin. But you were conscious of what you had done, and with a determined effort at repentance you could be forgiven by God. But you, whose sins were many and small, like those of most human beings, have found how hard it is to catch up with one's minor lapses. And no repentance of yours can possibly be effective until you realise that small things matter."

Selflessness vs. selfishness

The rabbis recognize a positive value to the yetzer hara: one tradition identifies it with the observation on the last day of creation that God's accomplishment was "very good" (God's work on the preceding days was just described as "good") and explain that without the yetzer ha'ra there would be no marriage, children, commerce or other fruits of human labor; the implication is that yetzer ha'tov and yetzer ha'ra are best understood not as moral categories of good and evil but as selfless versus selfish orientations, either of which used rightly can serve God's will.

Or as Hillel the Elder famously summarized the Jewish philosophy:
"If I am not for myself, who will be for me?
And if I am only for myself, what am I?
And if not now, [then] when?"

Another explanation is, without the existence of the yetzer ha'ra, there would be no merit earned in following God's commandments; choice is only meaningful if there has indeed been a choice made. So whereas creation was "good" before, it became "very good" when the evil inclination was added, for then it became possible to truly say that man could make a true choice to obey God's "mitzvot" (commandments). This is because Judaism views the following of God's ways as a desirable end in and of itself rather than a means to an end.

Value of repentance

The Babylonian Talmud teaches that "Rabbi Yochanan and Rabbi Eleazar both explain that as long as the Temple stood, the altar atoned for Israel, but now, one's table atones [when the poor are invited as guests]." (Tractate Berachot, 55a.)

Repentance in itself is also a means of atonement (See Ezekiel 33:11, 33:19, Jeremiah 36:3, etc.) The Hebrew word for repentance is teshuvah which literally means to "return (to God)." The prophet Hosea (14:3) said, "Take with you words, and return to God."

Judaism teaches that our personal relationship with God allows us to turn directly to Him at any time, as Malachi 3:7 says, "Return to Me and I shall return to you," and Ezekiel 18:27, "When the wicked man turns away from his wickedness that he has committed, and does that which is lawful and right, he shall save his soul alive." Additionally, God is extremely compassionate and forgiving as is indicated in Daniel 9:18, "We do not present our supplications before You because of our righteousness, but because of Your abundant mercy."

The traditional liturgy of the Days of Awe (the High Holy Days; i.e. Rosh Hashanah and Yom Kippur) states that prayer, repentance and tzedakah (charitable actions) are ways to repent for sin. In Judaism, sins committed against people (rather than against God or in the heart) must first be corrected and put right to the best of a person's ability; a sin which has not also been put right as best as possible cannot truly be said to be repented.

True repentance
To a man who says “I will sin and repent, I will sin and repent,” the Day of Atonement brings no forgiveness. For sins against God the Day of Atonement brings forgiveness; for sins against one's fellowman, the Day of Atonement brings no forgiveness till he has become reconciled with the fellowman he wronged (Mishnah Yoma 8:9).

According to Maimonides in order to achieve true repentance the sinner must abandon his sin and remove it from his thoughts and resolve in his heart never to repeat it, as it is said, “Let the wicked forsake his way and the man of iniquity his thoughts” (Isaiah 55:7). Likewise must he regret the past, as it is said: “Surely after I turned I repented” (Jer. 31:18). He must also call Him who knows all secrets to witness that he will never return to this sin again.

Atonement in the Temple period

Atonement for sin is discussed in the Tanakh. Rituals for atonement occurred in the Temple in Jerusalem, and were performed by the Kohanim, the Israelite priests. These services included song, prayer, offerings and animal sacrifices known as the korbanot. The rites for Yom Kippur, the Day of Atonement, are prescribed in the book of Leviticus chapter 16. The ritual of the scapegoat, sent into the wilderness to be claimed by Azazel, was one of these observances (Lev. 16:20-22).

Liturgical norms
The liturgy of the Days of Awe (the High Holy Days; i.e. Rosh Hashanah and Yom Kippur) states that prayer, repentance and tzedakah (the dutiful giving of charity) atone for sin. But prayer cannot atone for wrongs done, without an honest sincere attempt to rectify any wrong done to the best of one's ability, and the sincere intention to avoid repetition. Atonement to Jews means to repent and set aside, and the word "T'shuvah" used for atonement actually means "to return". Judaism is optimistic in that it always sees a way that a determined person may return to what is good, and that God waits for that day too.

A number of animal sacrifices were prescribed in the Torah (five books of Moses) to make atonement: a sin-offering for sins, and a guilt offering for religious trespasses. The significance of animal sacrifice is not expanded on at length in the Torah, though Genesis 9:4 and Leviticus 17 suggest that blood and vitality were linked. Conservative Jews and Christians argue at the present era that the Jews never believed that the aim of all sacrifice is to pay the debt for sins - only the sin offering and the guilt offering had this purpose; modern scholars of early Jewish history, however, often disagree and argue that this division came later.

Later Biblical prophets made statements to the effect that the hearts of the people were more important than their sacrifices:

 "Does the LORD delight in burnt offerings and sacrifices as much as in obeying the voice of the LORD? To obey is better than sacrifice, and to heed is better than the fat of rams"
 "For I desire mercy, and not sacrifice, and the knowledge of God rather than burnt-offerings"
 "The sacrifices of God are a broken spirit; a broken and contrite heart"
 "To what purpose is the multitude of your sacrifices unto Me? saith the LORD; I am full of the burnt-offerings of rams, and the fat of fed beasts; and I delight not in the blood of bullocks, or of lambs, or of he-goats"
 "burnt-offering and sin-offering hast Thou not required"

Although the animal sacrifices were prescribed for atonement, there is no place where the Hebrew Bible says that animal sacrifice is the only means of atonement. The Hebrew Bible teaches that it is possible to return to God through repentance and prayer alone. For example, in the books of Jonah and Esther, both Jews and gentiles repented, prayed to God, and were forgiven for their sins, without having offered any sacrifices. Additionally, in modern times, most Jews do not even consider animal sacrifices.

On the High Holy Days of Rosh Hashana, Yom Kippur, and the ten-day period between these holidays, repentance of sins committed is based on specialized prayers and hymns, while some Jews continue the ancient methods of sacrifice. An example of a common method of "sacrificing" for the sake of repentance is simply to drop bread into a body of water (as in the ceremony of Tashlikh), to signify the passing of sins and the hope for one to be written into the Book of Life by God once again. This is especially emphasized on what is arguably the holiest Jewish holiday, Yom Kippur.

See also
 Ethical monotheism
 Forbidden relationships in Judaism
 Golden mean (Judaism)
 Jewish ethics
 Reward and punishment in Judaism
 Ritual Decalogue
 Seven Laws of Noah
 Ten Commandments
 Three exceptional sins

References

Works cited
 

Sin
Sin
Point of view